Wolfgang Willrich (31 March 1897 – 18 October 1948) was a German artist of the 20th century, who created propaganda art during the time of Nazi Germany. In 1933, Willrich was employed by the Nazi government, for which he drew art depicting idealized racial standards and portraits of soldiers and party officials.

Biography 
Willrich was born on 31 March 1897 in Göttingen. His father, Hugo Willrich, was a hellenist and professor of classical philology at the University of Göttingen. Willrich started painting at an early age. In 1915, he attended the Berlin University of the Arts. 

In 1916, he was called up for service during World War I, serving as a Feldwebel in the 251st Infantry Regiment on the Western Front. As a Feldwebel, he received the Iron Cross. He was captured by the French and was interned in Orleans until 1920. During his internment, he created war art. After his release, Willrich resumed his studies in 1921 at the Dresden Academy of Fine Arts.

From 1933 to 1934, Willrich worked at the Reich Chamber of Culture, but was forced out due to his association with the Tannenbergbund. He worked for Richard Walther Darré, Reich Minister of Agriculture. 

In 1935, Willrich declined becoming a full member of the Nazi Party.

Willrich authored two books on art, Säuberung des Kunsttempels (The Cleaning of the Temple of Art) and Des Edlen Ewiges Reich (Of the Noble, Eternal Reich). The books condemned the art of the Weimar Republic as degenerate and encouraged the expression of racial consciousness in art.

In 1945, Willrich was captured by the United States Army in Normandy and imprisoned. He was released in 1946. 

Willrich died in 1948. He had started an autobiography which was completed by his wife in 1987.

Gallery

See also 
 Art in Nazi Germany
 Degenerate Art
 Heroic Realism
 Nazi Propaganda

References 

20th-century German artists
1897 births
1948 deaths
German portrait painters
German war artists
SS personnel
German Army personnel of World War I
German Army soldiers of World War II
German prisoners of war in World War II held by the United States
Deaths from cancer in Germany